Carlos Manuel dos Santos Fortes (born 9 November 1994) is a Portuguese professional footballer who plays for Indonesian club PSIS Semarang as a forward.

Club career

Braga
Born in Charneca, Lisbon metropolitan area, Fortes started his senior career in Spain with Racing Santander's reserves in the Tercera División. He then returned to Portugal after signing with Braga, being assigned to their B team and spending two full seasons in the Segunda Liga with them, scoring 11 goals in 2015–16.

Fortes played his only competitive match with the first team on 13 March 2016, featuring 90 minutes in the 3–0 away loss against Belenenses in the Primeira Liga. He split the 2016–17 campaign on loan, with Şanlıurfaspor (Turkish TFF First League) and Vizela (Portuguese second division); a permanent move was later agreed with the latter club.

Romania
In the following years, Fortes plied his trade in Romania, appearing for Gaz Metan Mediaș and Universitatea Craiova. He scored his first goal in the Liga I and top-flight football on 23 July 2018, helping hosts Gaz Metan to defeat Concordia Chiajna 2−1.

Indonesia
Fortes returned to Portugal and its second tier on 10 July 2020, joining Vilafranquense on a two-year contract. On 12 July 2021, however, he went back abroad and agreed to a one-year deal at Arema of the Liga 1 (Indonesia). He made his league debut on 5 September, starting in a 1–1 draw against PSM Makassar. He scored his first goal later that month, the game's only at Persipura Jayapura, totalling 20 over the season to help his team finish fourth in the table.

On 1 April 2022, Fortes moved to PSIS Semarang of the same country and league.

International career
Fortes appeared with the Portugal under-20 team in the 2014 Toulon Tournament.

Personal life
Fortes' older brother, Fábio, was also a footballer and a forward.

Honours
Individual
Liga 1 Goal of the Month: October 2021, February 2022
Liga 1 Best Goal: 2021–22

References

External links

Portuguese League profile 

1994 births
Living people
Portuguese sportspeople of Cape Verdean descent
Black Portuguese sportspeople
Portuguese footballers
Footballers from Lisbon
Association football forwards
Primeira Liga players
Liga Portugal 2 players
Campeonato de Portugal (league) players
S.C. Braga B players
S.C. Braga players
F.C. Vizela players
U.D. Vilafranquense players
Tercera División players
Rayo Cantabria players
TFF First League players
Şanlıurfaspor footballers
Liga I players
CS Gaz Metan Mediaș players
CS Universitatea Craiova players
Botola players
Ittihad Tanger players
Liga 1 (Indonesia) players
Arema F.C. players
PSIS Semarang players
Portugal youth international footballers
Portuguese expatriate footballers
Expatriate footballers in Spain
Expatriate footballers in Turkey
Expatriate footballers in Romania
Expatriate footballers in Morocco
Expatriate footballers in Indonesia
Portuguese expatriate sportspeople in Spain
Portuguese expatriate sportspeople in Turkey
Portuguese expatriate sportspeople in Romania
Portuguese expatriate sportspeople in Morocco
Portuguese expatriate sportspeople in Indonesia